The 2021 Canadian Mixed Curling Championship was held from November 7 to 14 at the Canmore Golf & Curling Club in Canmore, Alberta.

In a battle of Ottawa-area skips in the final, Quebec skipped by Jean-Michel Ménard from Gatineau, defeated Ontario's Mike McLean rink out of the Ottawa Curling Club in an extra end. It was Quebec's third mixed title, second in a row, and second for Ménard, who last won in 2001. 

The event was originally intended to be played in November 2020 (but billed as the 2021 event, as part of the 2020–21 curling season) in Canmore, but was cancelled. The 2021–22 edition of the event retained its 2021 branding to reflect the calendar year it was played in.

Teams
The teams are listed as follows:

Round-robin standings
Final round-robin standings

Round-robin results

All draws are listed in Mountain Standard Time (UTC−07:00).

Draw 1
Sunday, November 7, 2:00 pm

Draw 2
Sunday, November 7, 6:00 pm

Draw 3
Monday, November 8, 9:00 am

Draw 4
Monday, November 8, 12:30 pm

Draw 5
Monday, November 8, 4:00 pm

Draw 6
Monday, November 8, 7:30 pm

Draw 7
Tuesday, November 9, 9:00 am

Draw 8
Tuesday, November 9, 12:30 pm

Draw 9
Tuesday, November 9, 4:00 pm

Draw 10
Tuesday, November 9, 7:30 pm

Draw 11
Wednesday, November 10, 9:00 am

Draw 12
Wednesday, November 10, 12:30 pm

Draw 13
Wednesday, November 10, 4:00 pm

Draw 14
Wednesday, November 10, 7:30 pm

Placement round

Seeding pool

Standings
Final Seeding Pool Standings

Results

Draw 15
Thursday, November 11, 10:00 am

Draw 18
Friday, November 12, 10:00 am

Draw 19
Friday, November 12, 2:00 pm

Draw 20
Friday, November 12, 7:00 pm

Draw 21
Saturday, November 13, 10:00 am

Championship pool

Standings
Final Championship Pool Standings

Results

Draw 16
Thursday, November 11, 2:00 pm

Draw 17
Thursday, November 11, 7:00 pm

Draw 19
Friday, November 12, 2:00 pm

Draw 20
Friday, November 12, 7:00 pm

Draw 22
Saturday, November 13, 2:00 pm

Draw 23
Saturday, November 13, 7:00 pm

Playoffs

Semifinals
Sunday, November 14, 9:30 am

Bronze medal game
Sunday, November 14, 2:00 pm

Final
Sunday, November 14, 2:00 pm

References

External links

2021 in Canadian curling
Canadian Mixed Curling Championship
Canadian Mixed Curling Championship
Canadian Mixed Curling
Canmore, Alberta
Curling in Alberta